Sannikov Strait (пролив Санникова; proliv Sannikova) is a 50 km-wide strait in Russia. It separates Anzhu Islands from Lyakhovsky Islands, and connects the Laptev Sea in the west with the East Siberian Sea in the east. It is named after Russian explorer Yakov Sannikov.

References
 Location: 
 Geographical names: 

Straits of Russia
Bodies of water of the Sakha Republic
Straits of the Laptev Sea
Straits of the East Siberian Sea
New Siberian Islands